The 2023 Arkansas Razorbacks baseball team will represent the University of Arkansas in the 2023 season. The Razorbacks will play their home games at Baum–Walker Stadium.

Previous season

The Razorbacks finished in Omaha yet again, missing out on the championship series by one game, as they were eliminated by eventual national champion Ole Miss.

Arkansas won the Stillwater Regional and the Chapel Hill Super Regional to advance to the College World Series for the seventh time under Dave Van Horn and 11th time in school history.

Schedule and results

Record vs. conference opponents

References

Arkansas
Arkansas Razorbacks baseball seasons
Arkansas Razorbacks baseball